Papua New Guinea competed at the 2017 World Aquatics Championships in Budapest, Hungary from 14 July to 30 July.

Swimming

Papua New Guinea has received a Universality invitation from FINA to send two male swimmers to the World Championships.

References

Nations at the 2017 World Aquatics Championships
Papua New Guinea at the World Aquatics Championships
2017 in Papua New Guinean sport